27th ADG Awards
February 18, 2023

Period Film:
Babylon

Fantasy Film:
Everything Everywhere All at Once

Contemporary Film:
Glass Onion: A Knives Out Mystery
The 27th Art Directors Guild Excellence in Production Design Awards, honoring the best production designers in film, television and media of 2022, is set to be held on February 18, 2023, at the InterContinental Hotel in Los Angeles, California, United States. The nominations were announced on January 9, 2023.

Winners and nominees

Film

Television

Short form

William Cameron Menzies Award
 Guillermo del Toro

Cinematic Imagery Award
 Baz Luhrmann and Catherine Martin

References

Art Directors Guild Awards
2022 film awards
2022 in American cinema